Kathekani is a dryland farming area in Kenya's Eastern Province.

On November 29, 1976, Kathekani was the site of train derailment that killed 29 people.  Initial reports were that several hundred people had died.

References 

Populated places in Eastern Province (Kenya)